Novo Santo Antônio is a municipality in the Brazilian state of Mato Grosso.

References

Municipalities in Mato Grosso
Populated places established in 1999
1999 establishments in Brazil